Zăbala is a commune in Covasna County, Romania. It lies in the Székely Land, an ethno-cultural region in eastern Transylvania.

Component villages 
The commune comprises 4 villages:

Demographics

The commune has a Székely Hungarian majority. According to the 2002 census, it has a population of 4,814, of which 76.55% or 3,685 are Hungarian. There is also an important Romanian community.

Name

The name of "Zabola" means "bridle", i.e. the straps of leather that are put around the head of a horse to allow the rider to control it.

In the course of various battles with the Tatars, the villages north and south of Zabola were destroyed by the Tatars. However, the inhabitants of Zabola were capable of holding the Tatars in check and survived, as if they had put bridles around the Tatars horses in order to control them and their riders. 
Outside the village lies the "Tatárhalom" (Tatar Hill); some historians think the Tatars that were killed in action were buried there.

History 

It formed part of the Székely Land region of the historical Transylvania province. From 1876 until 1918, the village belonged to the Háromszék County of the Kingdom of Hungary. After the Treaty of Trianon of 1920, it became part of Romania.

Famous people

Count Imre Mikó, minister and reformer
Kelemen Mikes, born in Zagon and grew up in Zabola, in 1690 he became freedom fighter against Habsburg, escaped to Poland, France and at last Turkey. He is referred to as the "Hungarian Goethe" who became famous after writing "Letters from Turkey" in Rodosto where he lived in exile with the Transylvanian Prince Rákóczi until 1761. With his letters from Rodosto, Kelemen Mikes laid the foundations of the Hungarian prosaic literature, and he is regarded as the first Hungarian prosaic author.
Count Kelemen Mikes (1820–1849), freedom fighter in 1848/1849, became a Hussar colonel, died at the age of 29, hit by the first cannonball fired by the Russian army in 1849. He became a martyr to the Székely resistance movement.
Count Armin Mikes (1867–1944)

Things to see

Mikes Castle and park, which dates back to around 1500. It was once a fortified building with a tower in front. On the first floor all the ceilings are covered with frescoes. The castle in its current form dates back to 1867. It features a 34 ha English park.
Csángó museum

References

External links
 Zabola
Mikes Castle

Communes in Covasna County
Localities in Transylvania